All of My Mind is the first album of Japanese singer Kōji Wada. The album was released on December 5, 2001 through King Records.

Track listing

2001 debut albums
King Records (Japan) albums